John C. Dorhauer is an American Protestant clergy member, author, and theologian. He currently serves as the General Minister and President of the United Church of Christ (UCC), a Mainline Protestant denomination.

Career
Dorhauer received a B.A. in Philosophy from Cardinal Glennon College (1983), and an M.Div. from Eden Theological Seminary (1988), the same year that he was ordained in the UCC. He later earned a D.Min degree from United Theological Seminary, (2004) where he studied the effects of white privilege on the Church.

Dorhauer most recently served at the Conference Minister of the Southwest Conference, United Church of Christ. He previously served in the Missouri Mid-South Conference UCC and as the pastor of First Congregational United Church of Christ and Zion United Church of Christ, both of Missouri.

Dorhauer was the first person to conduct a legal same sex wedding in the state of Arizona when he performed the wedding service of David Laurence and Kevin Patterson on October 17, 2014.

General Minister and President
On March 19, 2015, Dorhauer was approved as nominee to serve as UCC General Minister and President. During the 30th General Synod, held in Cleveland, Ohio in June 2015, the nomination came before the delegates on June 29, 2015. Numerous delegates at the Synod voiced their concern at how the nomination failed to support minority diversity among leadership in the UCC, while many others publicly praised the nomination.

When the vote was called, 85% of the voting delegates approved the candidate's election. Dorhauer replaced the Rev. Dr. Geoffrey Black. John is the tenth person to lead the UCC since the denomination was formed in 1957.

He said that there will be two main themes to his tenure. One is to call on the denomination to rethink itself and to consider new ways of “being church” in light of reduced societal interest in institutional religion, and the steep decline in the membership of the UCC since the 1960s. He says alternatives to institutional churches, what some call the "emergent church," will not immediately supplant, but will grow alongside the institutional church for a long time. He will also call on the UCC to address white privilege.

Publications

References

External links

Rev. John Dorhauer Approved As Nominee For UCC General Minister And President
Bio for UCC General Minister and President Nominee Rev. John Dorhauer
Racial Justice Will Be Top Priority for New Prez of the United Church of Christ

Living people
Eden Theological Seminary alumni
American Christian theologians
United Church of Christ ministers
United Theological Seminary alumni
Year of birth missing (living people)